30000 Camenzind, provisional designation , is a very bright background asteroid from the inner region of the asteroid belt, approximately  in diameter. It was discovered on 4 January 2000, by astronomers of the Lincoln Near-Earth Asteroid Research program conducted at the Lincoln Laboratory's Experimental Test Site near Socorro, New Mexico, in the United States. The asteroid was named for 2014-ISTS awardee .

Orbit and classification 

Camenzind is a non-family asteroid from the main belt's background population. It orbits the Sun in the inner asteroid belt at a distance of 2.1–2.4 AU once every 3 years and 5 months (1,247 days; semi-major axis of 2.27 AU). Its orbit has an eccentricity of 0.08 and an inclination of 7° with respect to the ecliptic.

Naming 

This minor planet was named after American student Kathy Camenzind (born 1996), a 2014-finalist of the Intel science talent search (STS). The official  was published by the Minor Planet Center on 13 June 2014.

Physical characteristics

Rotation period 

As of 2018, no rotational lightcurve of Camenzind has been obtained from photometric observations. The body's rotation period, pole and shape remain unknown.

Diameter and albedo 

According to the survey carried out by the NEOWISE mission of NASA's Wide-field Infrared Survey Explorer, Camenzind measures 2.59 kilometers in diameter and its surface has a high albedo of 0.457. Such a high albedo is typical for E-type asteroids.

See also 
 3000 Leonardo (minor planet number three thousand)
 10000 Myriostos
 20000 Varuna
 30,000 (for the number thirty thousand)

References

External links 
 Dictionary of Minor Planet Names, Google Books
 Discovery Circumstances: Numbered Minor Planets (30001)-(35000), Minor Planet Center
 
 

030000
030000
Named minor planets
20000104